Illinois Route 8 (IL 8) is an east–west state route in central Illinois. It runs east from Illinois Route 97 south of Maquon to the intersection of U.S. Route 24 (McClugage Avenue) and Business U.S. 24 near Washington.

Route description 

Illinois 8 largely parallels Interstate 74 from Maquon to Washington.  After entering Peoria from the west, it crosses the Illinois River with Illinois Route 116 on the Cedar Street Bridge between Peoria and East Peoria. Illinois 8/116 stays joined until Camp Street, where U.S. Route 24 and Illinois Route 29/116 continue geographically northeast, and are signed east and north, respectively, with U.S. Route 150 westbound, forming a wrong-way concurrency. Illinois 8 turns east onto Camp Street with U.S. 150 eastbound. In spite of this concurrency, up until 2005 the eastbound I-74 exit to Camp Street was only marked for U.S. 150, while the next eastbound exit to Washington Street was marked as "To Illinois 8" even though Washington Street is unnumbered in East Peoria. At the Washington Street intersection, U.S. 150 leaves Illinois 8 and runs east-southeast towards Morton, while Illinois 8 runs east-northeast through unincorporated Sunnyland.

Near Washington, Illinois 8 turns westbound onto Business U.S. 24 (despite being signed as East Illinois 8) to terminate at U.S. 24.

History 
SBI Route 8 ran from Gulfport on U.S. Route 34 at the Iowa state line to Sheldon on U.S. Route 24 at the Indiana state line. It was truncated in 1965, with some of its segments moving to its modern alignment from Illinois Routes 78 and 116

West Farmington Road from Illinois Route 116 (West Plank Road) through West Peoria to Illinois Route 8 (West Southport Road) was marked as "Spur-IL-8" until 1970.  This was a popular route to Bradley University area (West Main Street, North University Drive).  Today, the route is marked as Farmington Road and not numbered.

Major intersections

References

External links

008
Transportation in Knox County, Illinois
Transportation in Peoria County, Illinois
Transportation in Tazewell County, Illinois